Olmsted Township is a township located in Cuyahoga County, Ohio, United States. Situated in the southwest end of the county, Olmsted Township is a west side suburb of Cleveland, and a part of the even larger Greater Cleveland area. As of the 2010 Census, Olmsted had a population of 13,513.  It is one of only two civil townships remaining in Cuyahoga County (the other being Chagrin Falls Township), and the only Olmsted Township statewide.

Geography
Located in the western part of the county, it borders the following cities and townships:
 North Olmsted - Cuyahoga County - north
 Olmsted Falls - Cuyahoga County - southeast, west of Berea
 Berea - Cuyahoga County - southeast, east of Olmsted Falls
 Brook Park - Cuyahoga County - northeast
 Columbia Township - Lorain County - south
 Eaton Township - Lorain County - southwest corner
 North Ridgeville - Lorain County - west

According to the United States Census Bureau, the township has a total area of 10.0 sq mi. All of the area consists of land, and none of it is covered with water.

Olmsted Township, is a part of the  Cleveland-Elyria-Mentor Metropolitan Statistical Area which in 2010 had a population of 2,077,240. Olmsted Twp. is also part of the larger Cleveland-Akron-Elyria Combined Statistical Area, which in 2010 had a population of 2,780,440.

History
After the discovery of the New World, the land that became Olmsted Township was originally part of the French colony of Canada (New France), which was ceded in 1763 to Great Britain and renamed Province of Quebec. In the late 18th century the land became part of the Connecticut Western Reserve in the Northwest Territory, then was purchased by the Connecticut Land Company in 1795.

In 1806, the vast tract of land comprising present-day North Olmsted, Olmsted Falls and Olmsted Township was purchased for $30,000 by Aaron Olmsted, a wealthy sea captain.

Government
The township is governed by a three-member board of trustees, who are elected in November of odd-numbered years to a four-year term beginning on the following January 1. Two are elected in the year after the presidential election and one is elected in the year before it. There is also an elected township fiscal officer, who serves a four-year term beginning on April 1 of the year after the election, which is held in November of the year before the presidential election. Vacancies in the fiscal officership or on the board of trustees are filled by the remaining trustees.  As of 2022, the board was composed of Riley A. Alton, Jeanene Kress, and Lisa Zver and the fiscal officer was Brian Gillette.

References

External links
 Township website
 Olmsted Falls Schools

Townships in Cuyahoga County, Ohio
Townships in Ohio
Populated places established in 1814
Cleveland metropolitan area
1814 establishments in Ohio